Awarua Bay may refer to:

Awarua Bay, part of Bluff Harbour, New Zealand
Big Bay (Southland), Fiordland, New Zealand